John Clements may refer to:

John Clements (actor) (1910–1988), English actor and producer
John Clements (politician) (1819–1884), Australian politician
John James Clements (1872–1937), South African Victoria Cross recipient
John Clements (GC) (1953–1976), George Cross recipient
John Clements (footballer) (1867–1945), English footballer
John R. Clements (1868–1946), president of Davis College
John Allen Clements, American physician
John Clements, American director of the Association for Renaissance Martial Arts
Jack Clements (1864–1941), baseball player

See also
John Clements Wickham (1798–1864), naval officer and judge
Jonathan Clements (born 1971), British author and screenwriter
John Clement (disambiguation)